Dacryphilia (also known as dacrylagnia) is a form of paraphilia in which one is aroused by tears or sobbing.

The term comes from the Greek words  meaning "tears", and  meaning "love".

Not much research has been conducted on dacryphilia, and the few studies that exist have been conducted online, often with small sample sizes. One 2014 study interviewed six people with dacryphilia and three of them were also involved in BDSM.  The paraphilia may also be experienced by those who do not consider themselves a dominant or submissive, and are motivated by compassion. They may be aroused when their partner cries during a movie or from the normal emotional vulnerability and strong feelings of love that may make a partner cry during intercourse.

References 

Paraphilias
Sexual fetishism